Horseshoe Canyon, formerly known as Barrier Canyon, is in a remote area west of the Green River and north of the Canyonlands National Park Maze District in Utah, United States. It is known for its collection of Barrier Canyon Style (BCS) rock art, including both pictographs and petroglyphs, which was first recognized as a unique style here. A portion of Horseshoe Canyon containing The Great Gallery is part of a detached unit of Canyonlands National Park. The Horseshoe Canyon Unit was added to the park in 1971 in an attempt to preserve and protect the rock art found along much of its length.

History

Human presence in Horseshoe Canyon has been dated as far back as 9000-7000 B.C., when Paleo-Indians hunted large mammals such as mastodons and mammoths across the southwest.  Later inhabitants included the Desert Archaic culture, the Fremont culture, and Ancestral Puebloans.  Occupation by the Fremont and Ancestral Puebloans was relatively brief; it is believed that the canyon was abandoned by Native American peoples by 1300 A.D.

The Great Gallery is one of the largest and best preserved collections of Barrier Canyon Style rock art. The gallery was a product of the Desert Archaic culture, a nomadic group of hunter-gatherers predating the Fremont and Ancestral Puebloans. A Works Projects Administration produced reproduction of the paintings is located at the Natural History Museum of Utah. The Holy Ghost panel of the Great Gallery has been dated to between 400 A.D. and 1100 A.D. by dating two rockfall events of which one exposed the rock face the panel on which it was made and the second damaging part of the panel.

Access
The Horseshoe Canyon trailhead is located on the west rim of the canyon.  It can be accessed from State Route 24 via  of graded dirt road, or from Green River via  of dirt road.  Both routes include segments of road that may become impassable when wet.  Visitors may camp at the west rim trailhead, on public land managed by the Bureau of Land Management, or BLM.  A vault toilet is provided but there is no water available. Overnight camping is not permitted in Horseshoe Canyon inside the Park boundaries.

The hike from the West Rim trailhead to the Great Gallery is roughly  round trip, and requires 3 to 6 hours to complete. The trail is fairly well marked, but reaching the Great Gallery requires a certain amount of stamina and endurance, particularly in the heat. Three other significant panels of rock art are passed en route to the Great Gallery.

See also

 List of canyons and gorges in Utah
 Bluejohn Canyon, tributary of the Horseshoe, site of Aron Ralston's accident
 National Park Service
 Koyaanisqatsi, a film that uses images from the great gallery

References

External links

 Canyonlands National Park - Horseshoe Canyon
 Canyonlands National Park - History of Horseshoe Canyon
 Canyonlands National Park - Archeology of Horseshoe Canyon, online-book 74 pages
 Wilderness Utah - Description and Photos of Horseshoe Canyon
 Barrier Canyon Style Rock Art

Canyons and gorges of Utah
Landforms of Wayne County, Utah
National Register of Historic Places in Canyonlands National Park
Archaeological sites on the National Register of Historic Places in Utah
Petroglyphs in Utah
National Register of Historic Places in Wayne County, Utah